Tuqma (Quechua tuqma canine tooth, urqu mountain, "canine tooth mountain", also spelled Tucma Orkho) is a  mountain in the Bolivian Andes. It is located in the Cochabamba Department, Mizque Province, Mizque Municipality. The Tuqma River or Tuqma Mayu (Quechua) which originates northwest of the mountain, south of a peak named Tuqma flows along its western slope.

References 

Mountains of Cochabamba Department